Pasture and Asplin Woods is a  biological Site of Special Scientific Interest west of Belton in Leicestershire.

These ancient woods on poorly drained clay soils are dominated by ash, with a shrub layer of hazel and hawthorn. There are herbs characteristic of ancient woodland, such as wood anemone and sweet woodruff.

The site is private property with no public access.

References

Sites of Special Scientific Interest in Leicestershire